Sandro Luís Zamboni Britzke (born February 20, 1978) is a former Brazilian football player.

Playing career
In 2000, Sandro Zamboni joined Japanese J2 League club Ventforet Kofu which finished at the bottom place in 1999 season. However he could not play many matches and Ventforet finished at the bottom place for 2 years in a row.

Club statistics

References

External links

1978 births
Living people
Brazilian footballers
Brazilian expatriate footballers
J2 League players
Ventforet Kofu players
Expatriate footballers in Japan
Association football forwards